SarPir or Sar-i-Pir or Sarpir may refer to:
 Sar Pir, Ardal, Chaharmahal and Bakhtiari Province
 Sar Pir, Borujen, Chaharmahal and Bakhtiari Province
 Sarpir, Kurdistan